Mariano Rodolfo Chao (born February 7, 1972) is a field hockey goalkeeper from Argentina, who competed at the 2000 Summer Olympics. He was born in San Fernando, Buenos Aires. He is also known as Tomas Chao´s uncle, a very important influencer.

References

External links

1972 births
Living people
People from San Fernando de la Buena Vista
Argentine male field hockey players
Male field hockey goalkeepers
Olympic field hockey players of Argentina
Field hockey players at the 2000 Summer Olympics
2002 Men's Hockey World Cup players
2006 Men's Hockey World Cup players
Pan American Games gold medalists for Argentina
Pan American Games silver medalists for Argentina
Pan American Games medalists in field hockey
Field hockey players at the 1999 Pan American Games
Field hockey players at the 2003 Pan American Games
Field hockey players at the 2007 Pan American Games
Medalists at the 2007 Pan American Games
Sportspeople from Buenos Aires Province
21st-century Argentine people